Crematogaster agnita is a species of ant in tribe Crematogastrini. It was described by Wheeler in 1934.

References

agnita
Insects described in 1934